This article lists fellows of the Royal Society who were elected in 2013.

Fellows (FRS)

 Harry Anderson
 Judy Armitage
 Keith Ball
 Michael W. Bevan
 Mervyn Bibb
 Stephen R. Bloom
 Gilles Brassard
 Michael Burrows
 Jon Crowcroft
 Ara Darzi, Baron Darzi of Denham
 William C. Earnshaw
 Gerard F. Gilmore
 Nigel Glover
 Raymond E. Goldstein
 Melvyn A. Goodale
 Martin Green
 Gillian Griffiths
 Joanna Haigh
 Phillip Thomas Hawkins
 Edith Heard
 Gideon Henderson
 Guy Lloyd-Jones
 Stephen P. Long
 Nicholas Lydon
 Anne Mills
 Paul O'Brien
 William D. Richardson
 Gareth Roberts
 R. Kerry Rowe
 Sir John Savill
 Christopher J. Schofield
 Paul M. Sharp
 Stephen J. Simpson
 Terry Speed
 Maria Grazia Spillantini
 Douglas Stephan
 Brigitta Stockinger
 Alan Turnbull
 Jean-Paul Vincent
 Andrew Wilkie
 Sophie Wilson
 Terry Wyatt
 Julia Yeomans
 Robert J. Young

Foreign Members (ForMemRS) 

 Margaret Buckingham
 Chen Zhu
 John W. Hutchinson
 Eric Kandel
 Elliott Lieb
 Kyriacos Costa Nicolaou
 Randy Schekman
 Eli Yablonovitch

Royal Fellow 
 Prince Andrew, Duke of York

Honorary Fellow 
 Bill Bryson

References 
 

2013
2013 in science
2013 in the United Kingdom